Peter Charles Patrick Oswald (born 1965) is an English playwright specialising in verse drama, resident at Shakespeare's Globe from 1998 to 2009.

Early life
Oswald was born the second of four children (eldest of three sons) of farmer and stockbroker Peter David Hamilton Oswald and Juliet (née McLaughlin), of Fliskmillan, Fife, Scotland. His uncle was Sir Julian Oswald, First Sea Lord from 1989 to 1993. The Oswalds were landed gentry, of Cavens, Dumfries, and Auchincruive (now named "Oswald Hall"), South Ayrshire, Scotland, descending from merchant George Oswald, Rector of the University of Glasgow from 1797 to 1799,

Career
Oswald was the first writer/playwright-in-residence at Shakespeare's Globe theatre, London, for which he wrote three new plays, from 1998 to 2009. He was later playwright-in-residence at the Finborough Theatre. Oswald established his own company, Heart's Tongue, to produce some of his plays.

In March 2022, Oswald was interviewed about his verse drama plays on the podcast Hamlet to Hamilton: Exploring Verse Drama, hosted by Emily C. A. Snyder and Colin Kovarik.

Personal life
Oswald is married to the poet Alice Oswald, with whom he has three children. They live in Devon, southwest England. His brother is the author James Oswald.

Books

 Peter Oswald; Mary Stuart. Samuel French, London, 2006
 Peter Oswald; The Golden Ass or the Curious Man. Comedy in three parts after the novel Metamorphoses by Lucius Apuleius. Oberon Books: London, GB. 2002. .
 Peter Oswald; Earth Has Not Any Thing to Shew More Fair: A Bicentennial Celebration of Wordsworth's Sonnet Composed upon Westminster Bridge (co-editor with Alice Oswald and Robert Woof) Shakespeare's Globe & The Wordsworth Trust, 2002 
 Peter Oswald; Fair Ladies at a Game of Poem Cards. A drama in verses after an eighteenth-century Japanese puppet play by the kabuki playwright Chikamatsu Monzaemon. Methuen Drama, London, GB. 1996 (USA: Heinemann, Portsmouth, New Hampshire). .

References

External links
 Peter Oswald's poetry

English dramatists and playwrights
Living people
Place of birth missing (living people)
1965 births
English male dramatists and playwrights